The WZ.X was the Polish reconnaissance aircraft designed in the mid-1920s and manufactured in the Centralne Warsztaty Lotnicze (CWL) - Central Aviation Workshops in Warsaw. It was the first combat aircraft of own design built in Poland, in a small series.

Development
The aircraft was designed by Władysław Zalewski, as his tenth design (Zalewski had already constructed aircraft for the Russian Air Force during the World War I). Work started in 1923, and the first prototype was flown in August 1926. Another airframe was built for static trials. Flight trials were successful: its performance was at least as good as the Breguet 19, and better than the Potez 25. However, maintenance was more difficult.

In 1927, two pre-series aircraft were built (designated WZ.X/II, WZ.X/III), powered by  Lorraine-Dietrich 12Eb used by the prototype, with a fourth (WZ.X/IV) powered by a  Gnome et Rhône 9A Jupiter radial engine with four-blade propeller.

The WZ.X did not enter serial production, because Poland had already bought many Breguet 19 aircraft from France, and started production under licence of the Potez 25 of the same class. Three WZ.Xs were given to aviation schools, where one or two survived in Dęblin until 1939.

Description
Wooden construction braced biplane, conventional in layout. A fuselage was semi-monocoque, elliptical in cross-section, plywood-covered. Rectangular two-spar wings, covered with canvas and plywood (in front), of equal span, slightly staggered. Ailerons on both wings, joined with struts. Strutted empennage, covered with plywood (stabilizers) and canvas (rudder and elevators). Crew of two, sitting in tandem in open cockpits, the first with a windshield. Conventional fixed landing gear, with a rear skid, the main gear with a common axle. Inline engine in front, driving two-blade tractor wooden propeller, with two round Lamblin radiators under the fuselage (in the WZ.X/IV - radial engine, with four-blade propeller and no radiators). Fuel tank in the fuselage.

The pilot had two fixed 7.7 mm Vickers machine guns with an interrupter gear, the observer had twin 7.7 mm Lewis machine guns on a ring mounting. Bomb load: unknown.

Variants
WZ.X/IFirst prototype powered by a  Lorraine-Dietrich 12Eb
WZ.X/IIPre-series aircraft essentially similar to the WZ.X/I
WZ.X/IIIPre-series aircraft essentially similar to the WZ.X/I
WZ.X/IVPre-series aircraft powered by a   Gnome et Rhône 9A Jupiter driving a four-bladed propeller

Specifications (WX.X/I)

See also

References

External links

Photos and drawings   at Ugolok Neba site

1920s Polish military reconnaissance aircraft
Biplanes
Single-engined tractor aircraft
Aircraft first flown in 1926